Not a Hero is a cover system 2D shooter video game developed by the British indie development studio Roll7 and published by Devolver Digital. The game released on 14 May 2015 for Microsoft Windows. A later update, which was built using the Chowdren runtime for Clickteam Fusion 2.5, introduced builds for OS X and Linux, on 1 October 2015. The PlayStation 4 version of the game released on 2 February 2016, with the PlayStation Vita version being cancelled. A Super Snazzy Edition, including a new extra campaign, was released on Xbox One by Team17 in May 2016, and on Nintendo Switch by Devolver Digital in August 2018.

Plot 

The anthropomorphic, purple rabbit BunnyLord has travelled back in time from 2048 to be elected as mayor to save the world as it is known from total destruction and alien invasion. During his candidateship, he needs to show the citizens why he should be elected and sets up freelance anti-heroes to clean up crime in the city under his name.

Gameplay 
Not a Hero is a 2D side-scrolling cover-based shooter presented in a pixel art style. Players can choose one of nine protagonists at the start of each level, each with their own twists on the mechanics of the game. The player is equipped with a primary weapon that can be upgraded temporarily or for the rest of the level with various upgrades found on the map. The player can pick up special weapons, such as deployable turrets or, more bizarrely, exploding cats. The player is unable to jump but can slide, and is able to use this to take cover against objects in the game world or tackle enemies, leaving them open to an execution. The player can only sustain a few hits, but health is regenerated quickly.

The objectives of each level vary, but they amount to accomplishing different tasks to promote BunnyLord's mayoral campaign, such as killing all criminals on the level, rescuing hostages or destroying drug production - each level also has three minor objectives to complete, with some randomness used to generate these. The game also boasts dynamic mid-level events, such as an attacking SWAT team or a helicopter gunship.

The nine protagonists, in order of unlocking, include: Steve, a cockney assassin who wields a fast-reloading pistol; Cletus, a supposedly-Scottish hillbilly who uses a shotgun to blow enemies backwards and shoot doors open; Samantha, a fast Welsh woman who can reload and fire while moving; Jesus, a hip-thrusting SMG-wielder, can run fast and execute enemies while moving; Mike, a rapidly-moving alcoholic from St. Helens, with a powerful sawed-off shotgun; Stanley, a slow-moving and slow-reloading paramilitary soldier with a high-capacity rifle; Clive, a bumbling spy who can shoot and run, as well as shoot two guns at each side of the screen; Ronald Justice, a deranged superhero wielding a hammer and pistol and Kimmy, who can use a katana in conjunction with her SMG. Each have various modifiers upon their normal gameplay mechanics such as movement speed.

Development 
Not a Hero was originally created under the title Ur Not a Hero by John Ribbins as a free indie game to accomplish his game list of ideas he made in 2012, which also included OlliOlli. Ur Not a Hero was released to on The Daily Click under the user name butterfingers on 10 January 2013. Although Not a Hero mostly relies on Ur Not a Hero, its mechanics are based on three games from John Ribbins' list: the cover-based shooter aspect, and with that the major aspect, comes from Ur Not a Hero, the indoor level design comes from his game Jeffrey Archer and BunnyLord's randomly generated sentences and sounds are from his game Hackathor. Roll7 later developed the game further, partnering up with ISO-Slant, a Clickteam Fusion add-on to make a 2D game appear 2¼D and to make one able to look around it using ISO-Slant glasses. This port was arranged by Roll7's artist Jake Hollands, making Not a Hero the first game to use ISO-Slant technology. The visual style developed for the game is a bright pixel art. In an interview, lead artist Hollands stated "I learned to create pixel art in the week before my interview at Roll7 and got much better at it whilst working on Not a Hero, but don't plan to return to it - I think that outside of a nostalgic choice there should be a good reason to use it".

The game was later picked up by Devolver Digital, who had published OlliOlli as well. BunnyLord was later given his own Twitter account to post his ideas and opinions about politics, as well as parodying it. On 21 April 2015, Not a Hero was announced to be hacked, although it later turned out to be official demo being released. For that, the developer, Roll7, created a web page for the so-called UJIP Party, representing the opponent of BunnyLord, with advertisement video, information on why BunnyLord's "illegal immigration" should not be tolerated and a download for the game's "hacked" demo. On 1 May 2015, Roll7 announced that the game's release would be delayed one week, due to Jake Hollands wanting to implement 60 FPS into the game, as all previous versions had run at 30 FPS. A later update, which was built using the Chowdren runtime for Clickteam Fusion 2.5 by MP2 Games, introduced builds for OS X and Linux on 30 September 2015. On 12 January 2016, it was announced that Not a Hero would be released for PlayStation 4 on 2 February 2016, with the PlayStation Vita version being officially cancelled later that day.

Reception 

The PC and Xbox One versions received "generally favourable reviews", while the PlayStation 4 and Switch versions received above-average reviews, according to the review aggregation website Metacritic.

Eurogamer gave the PC version an average review, saying, "Not a Hero isn't perfect, but it does enough to confirm that Roll7 is a developer to watch." EGMNow gave the PlayStation 4 version seven out of ten, saying, "The explosion-happy, pixel-art world of Not a Hero can be fun for short bursts. However, its inability to take anything seriously—paired with an intense objective system—leaves it somewhere in the middle."

Digital Spy gave the PC version a score of four stars out of five, calling it "An interesting and, importantly, fun game with enough going for it to keep you coming back, trying out new and different things and generally helping out in one of the most violently dodgy election campaigns ever seen." Metro gave the PC and PlayStation 4 versions seven out of ten, calling them both "A fun, funny, and wonderfully gory 2D shooter, but it's not quite as tightly designed as OlliOlli and certainly lacks the same longevity." However, The Escapist gave the same PC version two-and-a-half stars out of five, saying, "Not A Hero isn't a game for everyone. It's flawed [and] repetitive, but [it] works so well when it works."

References

External links 
 

2015 video games
Android (operating system) games
Cancelled PlayStation Vita games
Clickteam Fusion games
Devolver Digital games
Linux games
Indie video games
MacOS games
Nintendo Switch games
PlayStation 4 games
PlayStation Network games
Roll7 games
Single-player video games
Tactical shooter video games
Team17 games
Video games developed in the United Kingdom
Windows games
Xbox One games